Kane Smith (born 7 February 1996) is an English professional footballer who plays as a right-back for  club Stevenage.

A product of the Luton Town academy, Smith was released by his hometown club in 2014 and signed for Biggleswade Town. He joined Southern League Premier Division club Hitchin Town in December 2014 and played 123 times during his two-and-a-half years there. A transfer to Boreham Wood of the National League followed in July 2017. He spent five years at Boreham Wood, where he was a mainstay at right-back, making 181 appearances in all competitions. Smith signed for League Two club Stevenage in June 2022.

Early life
Born in Luton, England, Smith attended Stopsley High School. He is a lifelong supporter of Everton.

Club career

Early career
Smith began his career in the youth academy at Luton Town. During his time in the club's development squad, Smith was placed as first reserve to represent England Schoolboys in 2014. Luton opted against offering Smith his first professional contract, and he subsequently joined Biggleswade Town.

Hitchin Town
Smith signed for Southern League Premier Division club Hitchin Town in December 2014. He made his debut for Hitchin as a 76th-minute substitute in a 6–2 away defeat to St Neots Town on 21 February 2015. Smith played 11 times for the club throughout the remainder of the 2014–15 season. He scored his first goal in senior football in Hitchin's 3–1 victory against Slough Town on 22 August 2015. Smith trialled with Premier League club Crystal Palace in December 2015, playing in two matches for the club's under-21 team, although ultimately no transfer materialised. He also spent time at Ipswich Town in February 2016. Smith made 59 appearances for Hitchin in all competitions during the 2015–16 season, scoring seven goals, as Hitchin won the Herts Senior Cup in May 2016.

Ahead of the 2016–17 season, Smith played in two pre-season friendlies for Shrewsbury Town, as well as spending time on trial with Coventry City. Having missed Hitchin's opening four matches of the new season because of the two trials, Smith returned to the first team on 20 August 2016 against Stratford Town, and was initially deployed in midfield for the first time in his career, before reverting back to right-back for the remainder of the season. Smith played 53 times during the season as Hitchin missed out on promotion to the National League after losing in the Southern League play-off final to Leamington in May 2017.

Boreham Wood
Smith joined National League club Boreham Wood on 5 July 2017, signing a two-year contract. He debuted for Boreham Wood in the club's first match of the 2017–18 season, scoring in a 2–2 draw away at AFC Fylde on 5 August 2017. Smith suffered a knee injury in Boreham Wood's play-off match against AFC Flyde, which resulted in his substitution at half-time. He made 53 appearances during his first season with the club, scoring four times, as Boreham Wood missed out on promotion to the Football League after losing 2–1 to Tranmere Rovers in the 2018 National League play-off Final at Wembley Stadium. The knee injury sustained at the end of the season limited Smith to three appearances during the 2018–19 season.

Ahead of the 2019–20 season, Smith signed a two-year contract extension with Boreham Wood, with the option of a further year. Boreham Wood made the National League play-off semi-finals that season, with Smith playing 36 times in all competitions on his return from injury. He scored six times in 48 appearances during the 2020–21 season. The following season, Smith played in all six of Boreham Wood's FA Cup matches as they reached the fifth round of the competition for the first time in their history. Boreham Wood eventually lost to Premier League club Everton 2–0 at Goodison Park, with Smith playing the first 74 minutes. He made 41 appearances in all competitions that season. In June 2022, Boreham Wood stated that Smith would be leaving the club, with manager Luke Garrard stating — "He has been through loads but has, since his arrival, been monumental in all our success. He's had some tough injuries to overcome but has always faced them head on with hard work, discipline and with a smile on his face. We all hope he gets all the success that his attitude warrants".

Stevenage
Smith signed for League Two club Stevenage on 23 June 2022, officially joining the club on 1 July 2022. He debuted for Stevenage in the club's 2–1 victory against Stockport County on 6 August 2022, coming on as an 82nd-minute substitute in the match.

International career
Smith received a call up to play for the England C team, who represent England at non-League level, for a match against Republic of Ireland amateurs in May 2018.

Style of play
Deployed predominantly at right-back throughout his career, Smith has also played as a right-sided midfielder. His favoured playing position is at right-back. He has been described as "providing an attacking outlet" from defence, with previous managers highlighting his attacking runs from full back as a strength.

Personal life
Smith is married.

Career statistics

References

1996 births
Living people
English footballers
Association football defenders
Luton Town F.C. players
Biggleswade Town F.C. players
Hitchin Town F.C. players
Boreham Wood F.C. players
Stevenage F.C. players
English Football League players
Southern Football League players
National League (English football) players